"Flex" is a song by American rapper Polo G featuring fellow American rapper Juice WRLD from the former's second studio album The Goat (2020). The track was written by the artists alongside Chris Madine, producer Hit-Boy, and co-producer Dustin Corbett.

Background
In an interview with HotNewHipHop shortly before the release of The Goat, Polo G stated that he and Juice Wrld used to "link up" together when they were in California. He added that when he recorded the song with Hit-Boy, he left an open verse and Hit-Boy brought Juice Wrld to record a verse. In another interview with Complex, he said that the song had the feature he was most excited for on the album.

Composition
The song contains melodic production in the form of an "emotive" pop beat, and boastful lyrics from the rappers regarding their lifestyles.

Critical reception
The song received generally positive reviews, with particular praise on Juice Wrld's feature. Fred Thomas of AllMusic wrote that he adds "even more gravity" to the song's beat. Writing for HipHopDX, Eric Diep regarded Juice Wrld's verse as one of his best.

Charts

Certifications

References

2020 songs
Polo G songs
Juice Wrld songs
Song recordings produced by Hit-Boy
Songs written by Polo G
Songs written by Juice Wrld
Songs written by Hit-Boy
Songs written by Dustin Corbett
Songs released posthumously